Mychelle Crhystine Bandaso (born 1 May 1998) is an Indonesian former badminton player affiliated PB Djarum club. She won a bronze medal in the mixed doubles at the 2021 Southeast Asian Games partnered with Adnan Maulana.

Career 
In 2016, Bandaso won her first senior international title at the India International in the women's doubles event partnering Serena Kani. They also reaching the finals at the Singapore International. 

In 2017, Bandaso won the mixed doubles title at the Singapore International partnering Andika Ramadiansyah. In 2018, Bandaso finished as mixed doubles finalists in two events in Malaysia; the International Challenge with Ramadiansyah and the International Series event with Fachryza Abimanyu.

In 2019, Bandaso won her first World Tour title at the Russian Open in the mixed doubles with Adnan Maulana. The duo beating host pair Evgenij Dremin and Evgenia Dimova in the final in straight games. Bandaso and Maulana also finished as runners-up at the World Tour Super 100 events in Hyderabad and Indonesia. 

According to Debby Susanto, Mychelle Bandaso retired due to unspecified medical condition.

Achievements

Southeast Asian Games 
Mixed doubles

BWF World Tour (1 title, 2 runners-up) 
The BWF World Tour, which was announced on 19 March 2017 and implemented in 2018, is a series of elite badminton tournaments sanctioned by the Badminton World Federation (BWF). The BWF World Tour is divided into levels of World Tour Finals, Super 1000, Super 750, Super 500, Super 300 (part of the HSBC World Tour), and the BWF Tour Super 100.

Mixed doubles

BWF International Challenge/Series (2 titles, 3 runners-up) 
Women's doubles

Mixed doubles

  BWF International Challenge tournament
  BWF International Series tournament
  BWF Future Series tournament

Performance timeline

National team 
 Junior level

 Senior level

Individual competitions

Junior level  
 Girls' doubles

 Mixed doubles

Senior level

Women's doubles

Mixed doubles

References

External links 
 

1998 births
Living people
People from Tarakan
Sportspeople from East Kalimantan
Indonesian female badminton players
Competitors at the 2021 Southeast Asian Games
Southeast Asian Games silver medalists for Indonesia
Southeast Asian Games medalists in badminton
20th-century Indonesian women
21st-century Indonesian women